Janet Fairbank ( Ayer; June 7, 1878 – December 28, 1951) was an American author and suffragette, socially and politically active in Chicago and a champion of progressive causes.

Biography
Janet Ayer was born in Chicago, Illinois on June 7, 1878. She was the older sister of Pulitzer Prize-winning author Margaret Ayer Barnes.

Fairbank attended the University of Chicago and in 1900 married the lawyer Kellogg Fairbank, the son of industrialist N. K. Fairbank.  They had three children including the operatic singer Janet Fairbank (1903–1947).

Fairbank published her first novel, Home, in 1910. She wrote short stories, articles, and seven novels.

She was active in politics; a delegate to the Democratic National Convention from Illinois in 1924 and 1932, and a national committeewoman for the Illinois Democratic party from 1924 through 1928.

Fairbank died in Wauwatosa, Wisconsin on 28 December 1951, aged 73.

Bibliography 
  Home (1910)
  The Cortlandts of Washington Square (1923)
  The Smiths (1925) (runner-up for the Pulitzer Prize)
  Idle Hands (1927) (short stories)
  The Lion's Den (1930)
  The Bright Land (1932)
  Rich Man, Poor Man (1936)

References

External links
 Janet Ayer Fairbank Scrapbooks at the Newberry Library

1878 births
1951 deaths
20th-century American novelists
20th-century American women writers
20th-century American short story writers
American suffragists
American women novelists
Illinois Democrats
University of Chicago alumni